Psychrobacter celer is a Gram-negative, slightly halophilic, non-spore-forming, nonmotile bacterium of the genus Psychrobacter, which was isolated from the South Sea in Korea.

References

External links
Type strain of Psychrobacter celer at BacDive -  the Bacterial Diversity Metadatabase

Moraxellaceae
Bacteria described in 2005